Anton Aleksandrovich Vasilyev (born 6 February 1983) is a former Russian professional football player.

Club career
He played in the Russian Football National League for FC Irtysh Omsk in 2010.

External links
 
 

1983 births
Living people
Russian footballers
Association football defenders
FC Tobol Kurgan players
FC Tyumen players
FC Irtysh Omsk players
FC Ufa players
FC Sakhalin Yuzhno-Sakhalinsk players
PFC Spartak Nalchik players
FC Dynamo Barnaul players